
This is a list of the 48 players who earned 1992 PGA Tour cards through the PGA Tour Qualifying Tournament in 1991. 182 players entered the tournament.

 PGA Tour rookie in 1992

1992 Results

*PGA Tour rookie in 1992
T = Tied
 The player retained his PGA Tour card for 1993 (finished inside the top 125, excluding non-members)
 The player did not retain his PGA Tour card for 1993, but retained conditional status (finished between 126-150, excluding non-members)
 The player did not retain his PGA Tour card for 1993 (finished outside the top 150)

Winners on the PGA Tour in 1992

Runners-up on the PGA Tour in 1992

See also
1991 Ben Hogan Tour graduates

References

PGA Tour Qualifying School
PGA Tour Qualifying School Graduates
PGA Tour Qualifying School Graduates